Mu'adh ibn Muslim ibn Mu'adh was a general and governor for the Abbasid Caliphate.

He was a Persian from Khuttal or Rayy, who converted and became a mawla of the Banu Dhuhl tribe. He participated in the Abbasid Revolution in 737/738, and was a partisan of Abu Muslim. In 766, he was among the army of Marw al-Rudh which was defeated by the rebel al-Muqanna. He served as governor of Khurasan in 778–780, and fought against the Alids in 785/786. He probably died shortly after.

He was closely connected to the Abbasid family, and his family continued to enjoy high office: one of his sons, Husayn, was a foster-brother of Caliph al-Hadi, while another son, Yahya, served as governor of Syria and Armenia.

Sources 
 
 

780s deaths
Abbasid governors of Khurasan
Year of birth unknown
8th-century Iranian people
Converts to Islam from Zoroastrianism
8th-century people from the Abbasid Caliphate
People of the Abbasid Revolution